The Asura marriage is a non-righteous form of marriage in Hinduism. It is a form of marriage where a bridegroom receives a maiden, after having given of his own free will as much wealth as he can afford, to the bride, and her kinsmen. As a form of marriage performed by paying a bride price, it is generally stated to be forbidden, though it is sometimes cited to be allowed for members of the Vaishya and Shudra varnas. It is described in the Mansmriti.

Description 
When a man (groom) carries away a woman (bride or maiden) after giving wealth as may be sought by her father on the plea to recover the money spent on her upbringing, it is called Asura marriage. This type of marriage is recommended for Vaishyas and Shudra among four varnas of the Hindu social order in Hinduism. This form of marriage is not recommended for Brahmin and Kshatriya and as such considered as unlawful. Typically, it depends on will and desire of man and his wealth but irrespective of willingness of bride.

This type of marriage literally amounts to purchasing the bride by a paying a price to her kinsmen. By taking undue advantage of this type a marriage, a rich but incompetent man can have as many wives but poor and competent man may not be able to afford the money to be paid. For such reasons, this type of marriage is not considered as dignified but viewed as lowly.

References

Marriage in Hinduism
Family
Vedic customs